Chase Langford (born 1960, Pontiac, Michigan) is a Los Angeles-based American contemporary painter known for his paintings, inspired by geography and maps.

Education 
Langford's painting practice emerges from a lifelong fascination with the endlessly varied forms of the natural world. This fascination began during childhood, and grew rapidly; by his teens, Langford had gathered a personal collection of over 1000 atlases and maps. His cartographic impulse quickly carried over to his studies at the University of California, Santa Barbara (UCSB) where he studied geography and cartography., and later to a job creating maps for faculty at UCLA. His artistic training was supplemented with his time with the Berkeley Art Cooperative, working in ceramics, as well as life drawing at the Brentwood Art Center in Los Angeles, California.

Career
After graduation he started working with the Geography department of UCLA as their staff cartographer. Using his cartographic expertise he took geographic forms and filled the shapes in with colorful and expressive brushwork. These “map-paintings” were featured in the book ‘The Map as Art, Contemporary Artists Explore Cartography’. Langford gradually departed from using exact cartographic representation to fully abstract and expressionist works aided by his skills in life drawing and ceramics. Langford started to sell his painting in his home and studio at invite only events. In 2011 he was contacted by San Diego based artist Amber George who invited him to take part in a group show she was curating at Susan Eley Fine Art. In 2014, Langford held his own solo show at Susan Eley Fine Art.

Work
Langford's work stacks brightly contrasting pigments, which recall sedimentary cross-sections as much as they do aerial views of rivers, valleys, and rock formations. Langford begins his canvases with impulsive mark-making, a technique that forms and gentles to a refinement of aesthetic in abstract, layered shapes. His pieces are primarily oil paintings on canvas or wood panel, but also has some work on paper. Some include metallic paints containing bronze or aluminum.

Collections
Langford's work is in the collection of a few celebrities, hotels and museums, including:
Magic Johnson
The Saudi Royal Family
Paris Hotel Las Vegas
Caesars Palace Hotel Las Vegas
The Michael & Susan Dell Foundation, Austin, Texas
Monique Lhuillier
Pete Sampras
Four Seasons in Hong Kong
Park Hyatt Aviara
The Long Beach Museum of Art
Nordstrom Stores

Galleries
Langford's work has been exhibited in many galleries, including:
 Eisenhauer Gallery, Edgartown, MA
Foster/White Gallery in Seattle, WA
 Susan Eley Fine Art, New York City
 Elder Gallery of Contemporary Art, Charlotte, NC
Coagula Curatorial, Los Angeles, CA
 Kirkland Art Center, Kirkland, WA

Publications
His work has been featured in Metropolitan Home, and Huffington Post and Beverly Hills Lifestyle Magazine.

References

External links
Chase Langford website
Film by Eric Minh Swenson, “Chase Langford: Morphic Resonance”

1960 births
21st-century American painters
American abstract artists
American male painters
Living people
Modern painters